HD 152079 is a star in the constellation Ara and has one planet, discovered in 2010.

See also 
 HD 129445
 HD 164604
 HD 175167
 HD 86226
 List of extrasolar planets

References 

G-type main-sequence stars
152079
082632
CD-46 11085
Ara (constellation)
Planetary systems with one confirmed planet